Booty Call: The Original Motion Picture Soundtrack is the soundtrack to the 1997 film Booty Call. It was released on February 25, 1997 through Jive Records and consisted of a blend of contemporary R&B and hip hop. The soundtrack was a success, peaking at 24 on the Billboard 200 and 4 on the Top R&B/Hip-Hop Albums. It was first certified Gold on April 28, 1997, before earning a Platinum certification on November 18, 1998.

Three singles also made it to the charts, "Call Me" by Too Short and Lil' Kim, "Can We" by SWV featuring Missy Elliott, and "Don't Wanna Be a Player" by Joe.

Track listing

Charts

Weekly charts

Year-end charts

Certifications

References

External links

1997 soundtrack albums
Hip hop soundtracks
Comedy film soundtracks
Jive Records soundtracks
Albums produced by KRS-One
Albums produced by R. Kelly
Albums produced by Timbaland
Albums produced by Too Short
Albums produced by Studio Ton
Albums produced by Gerald Levert
Albums produced by Rodney Jerkins
Albums produced by Steely & Clevie